John Decker may refer to:

 John Decker (artist) (1895–1947), painter, set designer and caricaturist in Hollywood
 John Decker (fire chief) (1823–1892), American businessman, politician and firefighter
 John A. Decker (died 2006), Chief Judge of the Wisconsin Court of Appeals
 Jon Decker, White House correspondent for Fox News Radio